Joanne Sargent (born 29 October 1948) is a Canadian basketball player. She competed in the women's tournament at the 1976 Summer Olympics. At the university level, she competed for the UBC Thunderbirds women's basketball program.

Awards and honors
2014 Inductee: British Columbia Sports Hall of Fame
2019 Inductee: Basketball Canada Hall of Fame 
2019 inductee: Canada West Hall of Fame

References

1948 births
Living people
Canadian women's basketball players
Olympic basketball players of Canada
Basketball players at the 1976 Summer Olympics
Sportspeople from British Columbia
UBC Thunderbirds basketball players